The 2020 Ladies European Tour was a series of golf tournaments for elite female golfers from around the world. The tournaments were sanctioned by the Ladies European Tour (LET).

The season was affected by the COVID-19 pandemic with many tournaments either being postponed or cancelled. Among the cancellations was The Evian Championship, one of the LPGA Tour's five major championships.

Schedule
The table below shows part of the 2020 schedule. The numbers in brackets after the winners' names indicate the career wins on the Ladies European Tour, including that event, and is only shown for members of the tour.

Key

Unofficial events
The following events appear on the schedule, but does not carry ranking points.

Order of Merit rankings

Source:

See also
2020 LPGA Tour

References

External links
Official site of the Ladies European Tour
2020 Ladies European Tour Tournaments

2020
2020 in women's golf
2020 in European sport